Denkyira was a powerful nation of Akan people that existed before the 1620s, in what is now modern-day Ghana. Like all Akans, they originated from Bono state. Before 1620, Denkyira was called Agona. The ruler of the Denkyira was called Denkyirahene and the capital was Jukwaa. The first Denkyirahene was Mumunumfi.

History
Later, the capital of Denkyira moved to Abankeseso. The Denkyira state capital is now Dunkwa-on-Offin. Denkyira became powerful through gold production and trade with Europe.

In the 1690s, wars took place between Denkyira and the Asen and Twifo-Heman. The goal of these struggles was to keep open the trade routes to the coast and trade with the Fante State and Europeans.

The Denkyira state together with the Fante states dominated the trade with Europeans in Western Ghana while the Akwamu dominated trade with Europeans in Eastern Ghana.

The Denkyira state dominated the neighboring states apart from the Fante, Akwamu and Akyem. The Ashanti were subjects and tributary to Denkyira Kingdom until 1701, when with the help of Okomfo Anokye, the Ashanti defeated Denkyira at the Battle of Feyiase, and Denkyira became a tributary to the Ashanti Empire. This was led by Ntim Gyakari the then Denkyirahene.

In 1868 Denkyira entered the Fante Confederacy to align with the powerful Fante Union. The Fante Confederacy had also at this time become allies of the British. The Ashanti Empire also were allies of the Dutch people.

The present-day ruler of the Denkyira was Odeefuo Boa Amponsem III until his death was announced on 2 December 2016.

See also
Rulers of the Akan state of Denkyira
Upper Denkyira District
Twifo/Heman/Lower Denkyira District

References

External links
Denkyira
Tribes of Ghana

Ashanti Empire
Akan people
Former countries in Africa
History of Ghana
1500s establishments in Africa